The Man Who Went Out is a 1915 silent short film directed by Jay Hunt. It was released by Mutual Film.

Plot
The film is a drama about frontier life.

Cast
Herschel Mayall - Captain Edwin Graham
Roy Laidlaw - Colonel Graham, Edwin's Uncle
George Fisher - Lieutenant James Graham - Edwin's son
Margaret Thompson - Elsie

References

External links
The Man Who Went Out at IMDb.com

1915 films
American silent short films
Lost American films
American black-and-white films
Films directed by Jay Hunt
1910s American films